Turanogonia is a genus of parasitic flies in the family Tachinidae. There are at least four described species in Turanogonia.

Species
These four species belong to the genus Turanogonia:
 Turanogonia chinensis (Wiedemann, 1824)
 Turanogonia kalimpongensis Das, 1993
 Turanogonia klapperichi Mesnil, 1956
 Turanogonia timorensis (Robineau-Desvoidy, 1830)

References

Further reading

 
 
 
 

Tachinidae
Articles created by Qbugbot